Gidona or Gid'onah is a community settlement in northern Israel. Located near Ein Harod, it falls under the jurisdiction of Gilboa Regional Council.

History
Gidona was founded in 1949 as a moshav of workers by immigrants to Israel from Yemen. Near the cemetery of the first settlers of Ein Harod and Tel Yosef. In the 1960s the moshav became a community settlement.

Gidona is named after the prophet Gidon, who selected his soldiers for the war against Midyan in the nearby land, as described in the Book of Judges (f.e. chapter 7, verse 1).

References

Community settlements
Populated places in Northern District (Israel)
Populated places established in 1949
1949 establishments in Israel
Yemeni-Jewish culture in Israel